Rhamphocharis is a genus of berrypecker in the family Melanocharitidae that are endemic to New Guinea.

It contains the following species:
 Thick-billed berrypecker (Rhamphocharis crassirostris)
 Spotted berrypecker (Rhamphocharis piperata)

References

 
Bird genera
Taxa named by Tommaso Salvadori